The 2014 Cape Verdean Football Championship season was the 35th of the competition of the first-tier football in Cape Verde.  Its started on 5 April and finished on 31 May, earlier than the previous year as some days later, television viewers would later tune to the 2014 World Cup which took place in Brazil.  The tournament was organized by the Cape Verdean Football Federation.  CS Mindelense won the tenth title and their second in a row, its total number of titles superseded Sporting Praia's totals by one.  They did not participate in the 2015 CAF Champions League.

Overview
CS Mindelense was the team defending the title.  A total of 12 clubs participated in the competition, one from each island league and one who won the last season's title.  Again more than three clubs shared the same club name starting with Académica numbering four out of twelve.  Once again, half of Group B clubs would bear the first club name but only half would bear the name in the knockout stage.

SC Verdun of Pedra de Lume made their next national appearance in 34 years and first also featuring a group stage. Grémio Nhágar was the only participant of the north of Santiago that came from the municipality of Santa Catarina and Assomada.

The biggest win was Académico do Porto Novo who scored 5-0 over Sporting Clube from Brava.  Mindelense scored the most matches at home numbering seven and was a record at the national championships.

The season would have the fewest goals in history after the expansion of the clubs to over ten, fewer than last season.  Unlike last season, only two matches had nil points.  Week 2 had the lowest scoring. Some matches finished 1-0 or 0-1.

Participating clubs

 CS Mindelense, winner of the 2013 Cape Verdean Football Championships
 Académica Operária, winner of the Boa Vista Island League
 Sporting (Brava), winner of the Brava Island League
 Académica do Fogo, winner of the Fogo Island League
 Académica da Calheta, winner of the Maio Island League
 Sport Clube Verdun, winner of the Sal Island League
 Grémio Nhágar, winner of the Santiago Island League (North)
 Sporting Clube da Praia, winner of the Santiago Island League (South)
 Paulense Desportivo Clube, winner of the Santo Antão Island League (North)
 Académica do Porto Novo, winner of the Santo Antão Island League (South)
 SC Atlético, winner of the São Nicolau Island League
 FC Derby, winner of the São Vicente Island League

Information about the clubs

Italics indicates a team playing in a stadium in a different town or city.

League standings
Group A

Group B
Source:

Results
The group and calendar was sorted on February 15 in Praia by the Cape Verdean Football Federation.

Final Stages
All times are in Cape Verdean Time (UTC−1)

Semi-finals

Finals

Statistics
Top scorer:  Sy: 5 goals (of Académica do Fogo)
Biggest win: Académica PN 5-0 Sporting Brava (4 May)

See also
2013–14 in Cape Verdean football
2014 Cape Verdean Super Cup

References

External links

2014 Cape Verdean Football Championships at RSSSF

Cape Verdean Football Championship seasons
1
Cape